Giovanni Carnevale (4 August 192411 April 2021) was an Italian priest, writer and historian. His research revolves around the Carolingian age and Charlemagne.

Biography 
Giovanni Carnevale was born on April 4, 1924, in Capracotta, in the province of Isernia. Sixth son of his family, he stayed in his native country until the end of elementary school, when he moved to Umbria to attend the gymnasium in Amelia, and then finish in Lazio, to be precise in Frascati. In Lanuvio he attended the classical high school only for two years, and then stopped his studies because of the entry into the war of Italy and the bombing of the allies of Rome. During this period he continued his studies as an autodidact and obtained his diploma in Terni, he enrolled in La Sapienza in Rome to study law. His path as a priest began in 1947, when he went to Piedmont in the Salesian House of Bagnolo. He remained there until the completion of his studies in 1951 and was ordained a priest in Abano Terme on 29 June of the same year. As a priest he obtained a degree in letters and a degree in Christian archaeology, followed with habilitations in letters and art history.

When he became a teacher, he taught science in Faenza, then in the Salesian high schools of Macerata: classical, linguistic and scientific. He taught until he retired. During this period he enrolled at Bocconi in Milan, taught German and earned a degree in French and German at the University of Macerata, without ever withdrawing his degree. In 1994, he ceased teaching, although he was sometimes called to replace him.

Studies on the Carolingian age began after his scholastic career, under the influence of Marche structures. In fact, he concentrated mainly on the church of San Claudio al Chienti in Corridonia, assuming that its dating (11th century) was wrong. The turning point came when he discovered a building similar to the abbey existed in France, precisely in Germigny-des-Prés, near Orleans. He doubted that Aachen Cathedral in Germany was the Carolingian Palatine Chapel and consulted the sources directly, noting a misinterpretation of the story. From these studies he wrote numerous books, from 1993 to 2016, on Carolingian history, rewriting it completely. According to his studies, Charles Martel, Pepin the Short and Bertrada of Laon are buried in San Ginesio, under the collegiate church of Santa Maria Assunta, while Charlemagne at the church of San Claudio del Chienti.

Forced to a wheelchair, in 2016 he obtained honorary citizenship in Corridonia. He died in Macerata on 11 April 2021. His body rests in San Claudio.

Works 
 San Claudio al Chienti ovvero Aquisgrana, 1993
 L’enigma di Aquisgrana in Val di Chienti, 1994
 Aquisgrana trafugata, 1996
 La scoperta di Aquisgrana in Val di Chienti, 1999
 San Marone e l'alto medioevo in Val di Chienti, 2002
 La Val di Chienti e l'alto medioevo carolingio, 2003
 L’Europa di Carlo Magno nacque in Val di Chienti, 2008
 Il Rinvenimento delle sepolture di Pipino il Breve e di sua moglie Berta nella Collegiata di San Ginesio, 2010
 La scola palatina e la rinascenza carolingia in Val di Chienti, 2012
 Il ritrovamento della tomba e del corpo di Carlo Magno a San Claudio, 2013
 Vita di Carlo Magno imperatore nella Francia Picena, 2014
 Il piceno da Carlo Magno a Enrico I, 2016

Honor 
 Knights Hospitaller of the Order of St John of Jerusalem

References

1924 births
2021 deaths
Knights Hospitaller
20th-century Italian Roman Catholic priests
20th-century Italian writers
20th-century Italian historians
People from the Province of Isernia